The Qadhadhfa (also al-Qaddafa, Gaddadfa, Qaddadfa, Gaddafa) is one of the Arab Ashraf tribes in Libya, living in the Sirte District in present-day northwestern Libya. They are traditionally counted amongst the country's Ashraf tribes, and during the Gaddafi regime were regarded as being one of the greatest and most powerful tribes in the whole country. They are an Arab-Berber tribe.  They are now mostly centered at Qasr Abu Hadi, Sirte.

History
The progenitor of the Banu Qadhadhfa was Amr Qadhadhf al-Dam (عمرو قذاف الدم), who was claiming to be a descendant of Musa al-Kadhim.

The tribe has supported the idea of Arab unity as an Arab tribe in Libya itself. They are notable for their role in the 1969 coup d'état that deposed King Idris of Libya and as the tribe of his successor Muammar Gaddafi. The tribe has proven to be an influential player in Libya's ongoing civil war. It is known for its active presence in Sirte. Their dominance of the region caused Sirte to grow and become comparable to Tripoli and Benghazi in terms of national power. Qadhadhfa influence caused Sirte and Sabha to become completely loyal to Gaddafi during his rule of the country.

The Qadhadhfa fought for and supported the Great Socialist People's Libyan Arab Jamahiriya and the Green Resistance throughout the Second Libyan Civil War and the Libyan Crisis. After Gaddafi's death in October 2011, leading members of the Qadhadhfa demanded the return of his body by Misratan fighters for burial by relatives in Sirte.

Notable Qadhadhfa 

 Muammar Gaddafi – Leader of Libya 1969-2011
 Saif al-Islam Gaddafi – Libyan politician, son of Muammar Gaddafi
 Moussa Ibrahim – Libyan Information Minister
 Ahmed Gaddaf al-Dam – Libyan diplomat, cousin of Muammar Gaddafi
 Mansour Dhao – Libyan general, cousin of Muammar Gaddafi
 Wanis al-Qaddafi – Prime Minister of Libya 1968-1969 under King Idris, married the daughter of Omar Faiek Shennib of the House of Shennib, no relation to Muammar Gaddafi

See also

Gaddafi regime
Khamis Brigade
List of Ashraf tribes in Libya

References

Current biography yearbook, Volume 53, H.W. Wilson Company, 1992, p. 457.
Jean-François Bayart, Global subjects: a political critique of globalization, Polity, 2007, p. 56.
Dirk J. Vandewalle, Libya since 1969: Qadhafi's revolution revisited, Palgrave Macmillan, 2008, p. 73.

Arabs
Tribes of Libya